Glasgow Baillieston was a burgh constituency of the House of Commons of the Parliament of the United Kingdom. It elected one Member of Parliament (MP) using the first-past-the-post voting system.

Created for the 1997 general election, it took 54% of its voters from the previous Glasgow Shettleston constituency and 46% from the Glasgow Provan constituency. It included the areas of Easterhouse, Carmyle, Swinton, Baillieston, Garrowhill, Barlanark, Queenslie, Greenfield, and Garthamlock.

In 1997, the addition of much of the Shettleston constituency increased the notional majority of the previous Provan MP, Jimmy Wray, to 14,165 (40.7%) over the SNP.

The seat was succeeded by Glasgow East in 2005.

Boundaries
The City of Glasgow District electoral divisions of Baillieston/Mount Vernon, Garthamlock/Easterhouse, and Greenfield/Barlanark.

Members of Parliament

Election results

Elections of the 2000s

Elections of the 1990s

References

Historic parliamentary constituencies in Scotland (Westminster)
Constituencies of the Parliament of the United Kingdom established in 1997
Constituencies of the Parliament of the United Kingdom disestablished in 2005
Politics of Glasgow
Baillieston